Normal balance is the accounting classification of an account.  It is part of double-entry book-keeping technique.  

An account has either credit (Abbrev. CR) or debit (Abbrev. DR) normal balance. To increase the value of an account with normal balance of credit, one would credit the account.  To increase the value of an account with normal balance of debit, one would likewise debit the account.

The fundamental accounting equation is the following: 

 Asset = Liability + Owner's equity

The account on left side of this equation has a normal balance of debit.  
The accounts on right side of this equation have a normal balance of credit. The normal balance of all other accounts are derived from their relationship with these three accounts.  

Normal balance of common accounts: 
 Asset: Debit
 Liability: Credit
 Owner's Equity: Credit
 Revenue: Credit
 Expense: Debit
 Retained Earnings: Credit
 Dividend: Debit

Accounting terminology